Corpus Christi Priory was a Roman Catholic Premonstratensian priory in Manchester, England.

The Church
The Norbertine Canons Regular first came to Manchester in 1889 from the Belgian Abbey of Tongerlo and in the Miles Platting area of Manchester built Corpus Christi Basilica. The foundation stone of the church designed by William Telford Gunson was laid on 14 July 1906, by Bishop Louis Charles Casartelli and it was opened the following year on 5 November 1907. The basilica was later designated a Grade II listed building.

Corpus Christi became an independent canonry of the Premonstratensian order in 2004. The Norbertine Canons continued to serve Corpus Christi until 2007 when mounting repair and maintenance costs forced its closure. The final Mass was celebrated on 27 April 2007. The community initially relocated to St Chad's, Cheetham Hill, then to Our Lady Immaculate Church, Chelmsford, Essex, in 2008.

See also 

Listed buildings in Manchester-M40

References

External links 
Premonstratensian Canons

Premonstratensian monasteries in England
Corpus Christi
Corpus Christi
Minor basilicas in the United Kingdom
19th-century Christian monasteries
1889 establishments in England
19th-century Roman Catholic church buildings in the United Kingdom